The 1998 Cal State Northridge Matadors football team represented California State University, Northridge as a member of the Big Sky Conference during the 1998 NCAA Division I-AA football season. Led by Rob Phenicie in his first and only season as head coach, Cal State Northridge compiled an overall record of 7–4 with a mark of 5–3 in conference play, tying for second place in the Big Sky. The Matadors played home games at North Campus Stadium in Northridge, California.

Schedule

References

Cal State Northridge
Cal State Northridge Matadors football seasons
Cal State Northridge Matadors football